Shook is a 2021 American horror thriller film written and directed by Jennifer Harrington based on a story by Alesia Glidewell and Jennifer Harrington.  It was produced by Tara L. Craig and Squid Farm Productions. Shook premiered on Shudder on February 18, 2021.

Plot 
When Mia, a social media influencer, becomes the target of an online terror campaign, she has to solve a series of games to prevent people she cares about from getting murdered. But is it real? Or is it just a game at her expense?

Cast 
 Daisye Tutor as Mia
 Emily Goss as Nicole
 Nicola Posener as Lani
 Grant Rosenmeyer as Kellan
 Stefanie Simbari as Jade

References

External links 
 

2021 films
2021 horror thriller films
American horror thriller films
Films about social media
Shudder (streaming service) original programming
2020s English-language films
2020s American films